Bob and Mike Bryan were the defending champions, and successfully defended their title after winning 6–3, 6–7(5), 6–3, against Daniel Nestor and Nenad Zimonjić.

Seeds

Draw

Finals

Top half

Section 1

Section 2

Bottom half

Section 3

Section 4

External links
 2010 Australian Open – Men's draws and results at the International Tennis Federation

Men's Doubles
Australian Open (tennis) by year – Men's doubles